Kingsbridge railway station was the terminus station of the single track branch GWR line from Brent to the town of Kingsbridge.

Opened in December 1893 the stone built station served the town and the surrounding area. The station was also the railhead for the town of Salcombe. Work was started on construction of the extension of the line from Kingsbridge to Salcombe but work was soon abandoned. Popular for both local and leisure travel, the station saw a 25% increase in traffic during its last year of operation.

Despite a great deal of local opposition, the station was closed for freight and passengers on 16 September 1963, and the site is now covered by an industrial estate.

References

External links
Kingsbridge on Disused Stations
 Station on 1947 OS Map

Former Great Western Railway stations
Disused railway stations in Devon
Railway stations in Great Britain opened in 1893
Railway stations in Great Britain closed in 1963
Kingsbridge